Randolph Allen "Randy" Beales (born February 10, 1960) is a judge on the Virginia Court of Appeals. He previously served as Chief Deputy Attorney General and succeeded to the position of Attorney General of Virginia in 2001.

Early life and education
Beales is from Boydton, Virginia   and graduated from the College of William and Mary and received his Juris Doctor degree from the University of Virginia in 1986.

Career
Beales served in the federal government as a Republican appointee in the administrations of Ronald Reagan and George H. W. Bush.  In 1994, he was tapped by Virginia Governor George Allen to serve in the Office of the Secretary of Education leading the Governor's Champion Schools initiative.  In 1998, Beales was appointed Chief Deputy Attorney General by Virginia Attorney General Mark Earley.

On June 4, 2001, Earley resigned as Attorney General to seek the Republican nomination for Governor and Beales succeeded to the position of Attorney General.  He was later confirmed in that position by the Virginia General Assembly.

He was elected a judge of the Virginia Court of Appeals by the Virginia General Assembly on March 10, 2006 to a term ending on April 15, 2014. He was elected to an additional eight years on the Court on January 14, 2014, taking the expiration of his term to April 15, 2022.

References

Living people
Virginia Attorneys General
Virginia lawyers
College of William & Mary alumni
University of Virginia School of Law alumni
1960 births
People from Boydton, Virginia
Virginia Republicans
Judges of the Court of Appeals of Virginia
21st-century American judges